Werner Sele (born 24 June 1951) is a Liechtensteiner luger. He competed at the 1968 Winter Olympics and the 1972 Winter Olympics.

References

1951 births
Living people
Liechtenstein male lugers
Olympic lugers of Liechtenstein
Lugers at the 1968 Winter Olympics
Lugers at the 1972 Winter Olympics